The Symphony No. 71 in B flat major, Hoboken I/71, is a symphony by Joseph Haydn.  It was composed by 1780.

Movements
The symphony is scored for flute, two oboes, bassoon, two horns and strings.
Adagio,  – Allegro con brio, 
Adagio F major, 
Menuetto & Trio, 
Finale: Vivace, 

After dark string sonorities reminiscent of Sturm und Drang in the slow introduction, the Allegro begins with a very light galante theme which is interrupted periodically by more darkly colored strings.  The transitional material is notable for its use of counterpoint.

The slow second movement is a theme with four variations and a coda.  The second variation features a flute and bassoon duet over thirty-second notes and pizzicato bass.  Triplet-sixteenths dominate the third variation.  As usual, the final variation is recapitulatory, but here Haydn extends the variation with further development and a cadenza-like passage.

The trio of the minuet features solo sections for two violins against a pizzicato bass.

Notes

References
Haydn: Chronicle and Works, 5 vols, (Bloomington and London: Indiana University Press, 1976-) v. 2, Haydn at Eszterhaza, 1766-1790
Oxford Composer Companions: Haydn, ed. David Wyn Jones, Oxford University Press, 2002. 

Symphony 071
Compositions in B-flat major